(born 2 July 1939) is a Japanese swimmer and Olympic medalist. He participated at the 1960 Summer Olympics in Rome, winning a bronze medal in 4 x 100 metre medley relay.

References

External links

1939 births
Living people
Olympic swimmers of Japan
Olympic bronze medalists for Japan
Swimmers at the 1960 Summer Olympics
Olympic bronze medalists in swimming
Asian Games medalists in swimming
Swimmers at the 1962 Asian Games
Asian Games gold medalists for Japan
Universiade medalists in swimming
Medalists at the 1962 Asian Games
Universiade gold medalists for Japan
Medalists at the 1960 Summer Olympics
Medalists at the 1961 Summer Universiade
Japanese male freestyle swimmers
20th-century Japanese people